The following table is a partial list of artificial objects on the surface of the planet Venus. 
They have been abandoned after having served their purpose. The list does not include smaller objects such as parachutes or heatshields.

List of artificial objects on Venus

Notes

See also 
 List of artificial objects on extra-terrestrial surfaces
 Timeline of planetary exploration

References

External links 
  (in German)
 . NASA
 . Donald P. Mitchell

Venus
Missions to Venus
Lists of coordinates
Venus-related lists
Venus
Venus